Rocky Point Island is part of the Great Barrier Reef Marine Park, 10 km east of Cape Melville, Queensland.

References

Islands on the Great Barrier Reef